Tomáš Malec (born 13 May 1982) is a Slovak former professional ice hockey player. He last played for HC Kometa Brno in the Czech Extraliga (ELH).

Playing career

After playing two seasons in the QMJHL with Rimouski Océanic, during which the Florida Panthers traded his rights to the Carolina Hurricanes, Malec made his professional debut in the 2002 American Hockey League playoffs with the Hurricanes' affiliate, the Lowell Lock Monsters.  He made his NHL debut in the 2002–03 season with the Carolina Hurricanes, appearing in 41 games and recording two assists.

Malec played two more games with Carolina during the 2003–04 season, and was traded, along with a draft pick, to the Mighty Ducks of Anaheim after the season in exchange for goaltender Martin Gerber.  During the 2004–05 NHL lockout, Malec played with Anaheim's AHL affiliate, the Cincinnati Mighty Ducks.

Malec joined the Ottawa Senators organization for the 2005–06 season, playing in two NHL games with the Senators and spending the rest of the season with the AHL's Binghamton Senators.  During the 2006–07 season, he was traded to the New York Islanders in exchange for Matt Koalska.  He played for their AHL affiliate the Bridgeport Sound Tigers but never played for the Islanders.  In 2007, he moved to the Czech Extraliga, signing with HC Oceláři Třinec.

In his NHL career, Malec has appeared in 46 games and tallied two assists.

Career statistics

Regular season and playoffs

International

Awards and honours

References

External links

1982 births
Living people
Binghamton Senators players
Bridgeport Sound Tigers players
Carolina Hurricanes players
Cincinnati Mighty Ducks players
Florida Panthers draft picks
HC Kometa Brno players
Lowell Lock Monsters players
HC Oceláři Třinec players
Ottawa Senators players
Sportspeople from Skalica
Piráti Chomutov players
Rimouski Océanic players
Slovak ice hockey defencemen
HC Vítkovice players
Slovak expatriate ice hockey players in the United States
Slovak expatriate ice hockey players in Canada
Slovak expatriate ice hockey players in the Czech Republic